Grosbliederstroff is a commune in the Moselle department in Grand Est in north-eastern France.

It borders the German towns of Saarbrücken (180,000 inhabitants) and Kleinblittersdorf.

Grosbliederstroff is connected to Kleinblittersdorf by a bridge and from there to Saarbrücken by tramway, and to French highways A320 and A4.

History
777: Foundation

Geography

Climate

Former names
 777 : Blithario Villa
 1220 : Bliederstroff
 1223 : Bliderstorff
 1594 : Grossblietersdorff
 1756 : Blidertorf-le-Grand
 1779 : Blidestroff-le-Gros

Sister cities
  Kleinblittersdorf (Germany)

See also
 Communes of the Moselle department

References

External links
 

Communes of Moselle (department)